Barlavento is a Portuguese word meaning "windward".  It is used in several geographic features:
 Barlavento Islands — the northern group of Cape Verde islands
 Barlavento Algarvio — the western part of the Algarve region, in Portugal

See also 
 Barlovento (disambiguation), the Spanish language equivalent